Denis Bertolini (born 13 December 1977 in Rovereto) is an Italian former professional road racing cyclist.

Major results
2001
 1st  Road race, Mediterranean Games
2004
 1st Stages 2 & 6 Circuit de Lorraine
 1st Stage 2 Peace Race

References

1977 births
Living people
Italian male cyclists
Mediterranean Games gold medalists for Italy
Mediterranean Games medalists in cycling
Competitors at the 2001 Mediterranean Games
Sportspeople from Trentino
Cyclists from Trentino-Alto Adige/Südtirol